Each year the Alabama Mr. Basketball award is given to the person chosen as the best high school boys basketball player in the U.S. state of Alabama.  The award winner is selected by members of the Alabama Sports Writers Association.

Award winners

Schools with multiple winners

Most Winners By College

See also
Alabama Miss Basketball

References

External links
ASWA Basketball Player of the Year

Mr. and Miss Basketball awards
Basketball in Alabama
Awards established in 1979
Lists of people from Alabama
Mr. Basketball